This Time of Year EP is the second EP released by Orange County-based rock band Project 86. The release was first announced on September 23, 2008 through the band's official MySpace blog. Nine days later, the band released a further update naming the new release as This Time of Year, and specifying the release date as November 18, 2008. The release date was then changed to November 25, 2008. The EP contains four new songs, as well as a cover of the song, This Time of The Year, which was created for the Christmas season of 2007. The instrumental song "What Child?" uses elements from the traditional English folk song Greensleeves.

Track listing

Credits
 Andrew Schwab - Vocals
 Randy Torres - Lead Guitar, Keyboards, Backing Vocals
 Steven Dail - Bass, Rhythm Guitar, Backing Vocals
 Jason Gerken - Drums

Project 86 albums
2008 EPs
2008 Christmas albums
Christmas albums by American artists
Rock Christmas albums